

Events
 1482 – Francesco di Giorgio Martini, Trattato di architettura, ingegneria e arte militare ("Treatise of Architecture, Engineering and Military Art") is completed after this date
 1485 – Leon Battista Alberti, De Re Aedificatoria (written 1443–52) becomes the first printed work on architecture

Buildings and structures

Buildings

 1480 – Ancienne Douane (Colmar) completed.
 c.1480 – Great Barn, Hales Hall, Loddon, Norfolk, England, completed.
 1481 – Palazzo Loredan on the Grand Canal (Venice), designed by Mauro Codussi, is begun (completed 1509).
 1482–1489 – Ginkaku-ji ("Temple of the Silver Pavilion") in Kyoto, Japan, is constructed.
 1483–1488 – Church of Mariä Krönung (Lautenbach) consecrated and completed.
 1483 – The Changgyeonggung of Korea is completed.
 1484–1489 – Koyunbaba Bridge in Anatolia is constructed.
 1484 – Palazzo Medici in Florence, begun by Michelozzo c.1444/45, is completed.
 1486 – Rebuilding at Metz Cathedral begins.
 1487 – Italian architects begin to build the Moscow Kremlin.
 1489 – Église Saint-Maurice, Soultz-Haut-Rhin completed (started in 1270)

Births
 1483: April 6 – Raphael, Italian painter and architect (died 1520)
 1484: April 12 – Antonio da Sangallo the Younger, Italian architect (died 1546)
 1486: July 2 – Jacopo Sansovino, Italian sculptor and architect (died 1570)
 1489: April 15 – Mimar Sinan, Ottoman Turkish architect (died 1588)

Deaths
 c. 1481 – Guiniforte Solari, Milanese sculptor, architect and engineer (born c. 1429)

References 

Architecture